Konstantinos Kritikos (born 21 October 1991) is a Greek footballer who plays as a right back for Diagoras Agia Paraskevi.

Career
Kritikos began playing football with Olympiacos U20. He was loaned to Zakynthos for one year from Olympiacos. In January 2011 Kritikos was loaned to Rouf F.C. He also played for Glyfada F.C. and Ethnikos Piraeus F.C.

In January 2014, Kritikos signed for NOFV-Oberliga Nord club FC Pommern Greifswald. In August 2014, Kritikos signed for Football League (Greece) club Fostiras F.C. In February 2015, Kritikos signed for SuperLeague club OFI Crete. In July 2015, Kritikos signed for Football League club Episkopi F.C. In January 2016, he signed for Aiolikos.

References

External links
Myplayer.gr Profile
Profile at epae.org

1991 births
Living people
Footballers from Athens
Greek footballers
Greek expatriate footballers
Association football defenders
Olympiacos F.C. players
A.P.S. Zakynthos players
A.O. Glyfada players
Ethnikos Piraeus F.C. players
Football League (Greece) players